Béla Gyarmati (born 5 March 1942) is a Hungarian fencer. He competed in the team foil event at the 1964 Summer Olympics.

References

External links
 

1942 births
Living people
Hungarian male foil fencers
Olympic fencers of Hungary
Fencers at the 1964 Summer Olympics
Martial artists from Budapest